The list of ship launches in 1722 includes a chronological list of some ships launched in 1722.


References

1722
Ship launches